The 3rd New York State Legislature, consisting of the New York State Senate and the New York State Assembly, met from August 18, 1779, to July 2, 1780, during the third year of George Clinton's governorship, first at Kingston, then at Albany, and finally at Kingston again.

Background
Under the provisions of the New York Constitution of 1777, the State Senators were elected on general tickets in the senatorial districts, and were then divided into four classes. Six senators each drew lots for a term of 1, 2, 3 or 4 years and, beginning at the election in April 1778, every year six Senate seats came up for election to a four-year term. Assemblymen were elected countywide on general tickets to a one-year term, the whole assembly being renewed annually.

On May 8, 1777, the Constitutional Convention had appointed the senators from the Southern District, and the assemblymen from Kings, New York, Queens, Richmond and Suffolk counties—the area which was under British control—and determined that these appointees serve in the Legislature until elections could be held in those areas, presumably after the end of the American Revolutionary War. Vacancies among the appointed members in the Senate should be filled by the Assembly, and vacancies in the Assembly by the Senate.

Elections
The State elections were held from April 27 to 29, 1779. Under the determination by the Constitutional Convention, the senators Jonathan Lawrence, Lewis Morris and Richard Morris, whose seats were up for election, continued in office, as well as the assemblymen from Kings, New York, Queens, Richmond and Suffolk counties. Zephaniah Platt (Middle D.) was re-elected. Ephraim Paine (Middle D.) and Abraham Ten Broeck (Western D.) were also elected to the Senate. In the Eastern District, a special election was held to fill the vacancy caused by the expulsion of John Williams, and Assemblyman Elishama Tozer was elected to a one-year term.

Sessions

The State Legislature met first in Kingston, the seat of Ulster County. The Assembly met on August 18, the Senate on August 24, 1779; and both adjourned on October 25. The Legislature reconvened at the Old City Hall in Albany, the seat of Albany County, on January 27, 1780; and the Senate adjourned on March 14, the Assembly on March 17. The Legislature reconvened again in Kingston on April 22, and adjourned finally on July 2. Senator Richard Morris (Southern D.) was appointed Chief Judge of the New York Supreme Court, and thus vacated his seat to which Ex-Assemblyman Stephen Ward was appointed.

State Senate

Districts
The Southern District (9 seats) consisted of Kings, New York, Queens, Richmond, Suffolk and Westchester counties.
The Middle District (6 seats) consisted of Dutchess, Orange and Ulster counties.
The Eastern District (3 seats) consisted of Charlotte, Cumberland and Gloucester counties.
The Western District (6 seats) consisted of Albany and Tryon counties.

Note: There are now 62 counties in the State of New York. The counties which are not mentioned in this list had not yet been established, or sufficiently organized, the area being included in one or more of the abovementioned counties. In 1784, Charlotte Co. was renamed Washington Co., and Tryon Co. was renamed Montgomery Co.

Senators
The asterisk (*) denotes members of the previous Legislature who continued in office as members of this Legislature. Elishama Tozer changed from the Assembly to the Senate.

Employees
Clerk: Robert Benson

State Assembly

Districts

The City and County of Albany (10 seats)
Charlotte County (4 seats)
Cumberland County (3 seats)
Dutchess County (7 seats)
Gloucester County (2 seats)
Kings County (2 seats)
The City and County of New York (9 seats)
Orange County (4 seats)
Queens County (4 seats)
Richmond County (2 seats)
Suffolk County (5 seats)
Tryon County (6 seats)
Ulster County (6 seats)
Westchester County (6 seats)

Note: There are now 62 counties in the State of New York. The counties which are not mentioned in this list had not yet been established, or sufficiently organized, the area being included in one or more of the abovementioned counties. In 1784, Charlotte Co. was renamed Washington Co., and Tryon Co. was renamed Montgomery Co.

Assemblymen
The asterisk (*) denotes members of the previous Legislature who continued as members of this Legislature.

Employees
Clerk: John McKesson
Sergeant-at-Arms: John Tillman Jr.
Doorkeeper: Richard Ten Eyck

Notes

Sources
The New York Civil List compiled by Franklin Benjamin Hough (Weed, Parsons and Co., 1858) [see pg. 108 for Senate districts; pg. 111 for senators; pg. 148f for Assembly districts; pg. 158f for assemblymen]

1779 in New York (state)
1780 in New York (state)
003